The Arun Jaitley Stadium (formerly Feroz Shah Kotla Stadium) is a cricket ground in Delhi, India. The ground has hosted 34 Test matches, the first of these was in 1948 between India and the West Indies. Twenty-four One Day Internationals (ODIs) have also been played at the ground, the first in 1982 between India and Sri Lanka.

The first Test century (100 or more runs in a single innings) scored at the ground was in 1948 by the West Indian Clyde Walcott in the first innings of the first Test match played at the Arun Jaitley Ground. The first Indian to score a century at the ground was Hemu Adhikari in the second innings of the same match. In total, Test centuries have been scored at the ground on 65 occasions. Virat Kohli's 243, scored against Sri Lanka in 2017, is the highest Test innings achieved at the ground. Dilip Vengsarkar has scored the most Test centuries at the ground with 4.

Seven ODI centuries have been scored at the Arun Jaitley Ground, the Sri Lankan Roy Dias scored the first in 1982 with 102 against India. The Australian Ricky Ponting holds the record for the highest ODI score at the ground with 145 from 158 balls which was made against Zimbabwe in 1998.

Key
 * denotes that the batsman was not out.
 Inns. denotes the number of the innings in the match.
 Balls denotes the number of balls faced in an innings.
 NR denotes that the number of balls was not recorded.
 Parentheses next to the player's score denotes his century number at the Arun Jaitley Ground.
 The column title Date refers to the date the match started.
 The column title Result refers to whether the player's team won, lost or if the match was drawn.

Test centuries
The following table summarises the Test centuries scored at the Arun Jaitley Ground.

ODI Centuries

The following table summarises the One Day International centuries scored at the Arun Jaitley Ground.

References 

Cricket grounds in Delhi
Centuries
Feroz